Can't Buy Me Love (Chinese: 公主嫁到) is a 2010 Hong Kong television series. It is a grand production by TVB and starred Charmaine Sheh and Moses Chan as the lead casts while Linda Chung, Raymond Wong, Kenneth Ma and Fala Chen as the main cast for this series.

The television series was released in Hong Kong on TVB Jade network on 23 August 2010, in the third-line time slot (starting at around 21:30 in UTC+8), airing between Monday-Friday every night at this hour.

Like many TVB series, especially comedies, the name of the series is a pun. "公主嫁到" means "The Princess Comes by Marriage", while its homonym "公主駕到" which roughly translates to "The Princess Cometh" is a phase used to formally announce the arrival of a princess.

Synopsis
Set during the Tang dynasty of China, Can't Buy Me Love tells the story of the Third Princess, Princess Chiu Yeung (Charmaine Sheh), of the Tang Emperor (Samuel Kwok), who is beautiful but very unreasonable, and, as such, no one wants to marry her.

The Kam family is the largest gold manufacturer in the grand capital Chang'an, but because they are deceived, the business runs into troubles. The second son of the Kam family Kam Tuo Luk (Moses Chan) has to marry the Third Princess to save the family business, because then they will have the right to manufacture gold pieces for the Tang Palace, the Third Princess only agreeing to the marriage because otherwise she would be married off to the Tibetan king Songtsen Gampo, as schemed by the evil Concubine Wei (Kara Hui).

The Princess brings many servants to the Kam family after marrying Kam Tuo Luk, and constantly comes into conflict with the members of the Kam family (Lee Heung Kam, Susanna Kwan, Louis Yuen, Raymond Wong Ho-yin). The Princess brings Szeto Ngan Ping (Fala Chen), with her to the Kam family, who has been awarded "Best Servant" by the Concubine Dowager Chui (Susan Tse) and later became wife of Ding Yau Wai (Kenneth Ma).

The Princess originally decides to leave the house, but when she misunderstands that the Kam family speaks negatively of her, she stubbornly stays. Later, she and Kam Tuo Luk fall in love. When the Kam family is convicted of a capital offence, she divorces Kam Tuo Luk to secretly save the Kam family.

Development
After the huge success of Beyond the Realm of Conscience, the filming of a similarly set costume drama comedy was announced. Can't Buy Me Love was featured in the TVB 2010 sales presentation clip, which was released shortly after the TVB Awards Presentation.

The drama became popular compared to Beyond the Realm of Conscience due to its similar lavish costumes and sets, cast members, and close time period (both set during the Tang dynasty of China). They were also compared to since Can't Buy Me Love also had links with the Tang imperial palace, though it had far more scenes outside the palace. It has also been widely and popularly named the indirect sequel (although it should really be a prequel, due to it being set during Taizong's reign) to its predecessor, despite their entirely different genres (Can't Buy Me Love being a romantic comedy, while Beyond the Realm of Conscience being a historical drama). The two series share the same producer, Mui Siu Ching.

To capture the grandeur of the Tang dynasty, custom-made elaborate costumes and sets were created for the series, resembling those of Beyond the Realm of Conscience in a comical way. Elaborate costumes have been made for grand series produced by TVB in the past, especially costume dramas including War and Beauty and The Charm Beneath. A costume fitting featuring majority of the cast was held on 17 December 2009 at 12:30 pm in Hong Kong, in front of the Shaolin Temple in TVB City's Ancient Street, Tseung Kwan O. A blessing ceremony was held for Can't Buy Me Love on 26 February 2010. Filming was completed in April 2010.

Especially grand was Charmaine Sheh's wedding ceremony headgear. The heavy headwear proved to be difficult for the cast and resulted in injuries and discomforts during filming. Television Broadcasts Limited created much hype prior to the release of the series, having numerous news on the progress of the series' filming published on TVB Weekly magazine and letting out news on the filming progress.

Three official trailers were released near the date of release, the first making a parody out of Beyond the Realm of Conscience. Malaysia's Astro on Demand channel also showed previews of the drama. Because of the drama's high ratings during the early episodes (the series reportedly managed a peak of 36 points in its first week) and a celebratory event was scheduled. However, because of the hostage-taking incident in the Philippines, the event was cancelled and the Hong Kong Broadcasting Authority received complaints for a comedy being aired at a tragic time.

Format
The television series is a romantic comedy costume drama, featuring lavish costumes and sets intended to capture the luxury and grandeur of the Tang dynasty, and makes parodies out of other Hong Kong television shows, including dramas and varieties. The show regularly utilizes numerous original poems throughout the series for comedic effect, the poems being a hybrid between classical Chinese compositions and modern rap in terms of both structure and word choice.

The drama is set to have 32 episodes, with a definitive beginning and ending to the story. Each episode is around 45 minutes long. Bickering is a major part of the comedic aspect of the drama. Apart from this romantic plot, the series also focuses on the protagonists under threat from villains, and therefore part of the plot focuses on scheming in the palace. This theme (especially those within the imperial harem, such as imperial concubines) have long been in existence in TVB dramas, especially after the hit 2004 TVB series War and Beauty.

The series, apart from the main couple, Charmaine Sheh and Moses Chan, two supporting couples, Linda Chung and Raymond Wong Ho-yin, Fala Chen and Kenneth Ma also share a romantic storyline.

Historical trivia
 None of the princesses featured in the drama are historically recorded princesses, though their names are loosely based on popular characters given to imperial princesses. The princesses in the drama are named, in descending age or ranking, Princess Yonghe the Eldest (Sharon Chan), Princess Qingyun (Tracy Ip), Princess Zhaoyang (Charmaine Sheh), Princess Qinping (Yoyo Chen), Princess Qinhui (Charmaine Li) and Princess Dexin (Linda Chung), none of whom are historically recorded imperial princesses.
 It is revealed that the fictional Princess Yonghe's (Sharon Chan) mother was Empress Zhangsun, who is revered as one of the most benevolent empresses of Chinese history. Empress Zhangsun made notable contributions to peasantry and labour, and even towards Chinese technology despite her elevated status as an Empress during her lifetime.
 The Emperor featured in the series is Emperor Taizong of Tang, the second Emperor of the Tang dynasty. Princess Zhaoyang (Charmaine Sheh) explicitly admires her father. Emperor Taizong, while still only a duke's son, assisted his father, then the Duke of Tang, to overthrow the brief Sui dynasty, thus establishing the Tang Dynasty and paving the road for one of China's golden ages.
 The series reveals (fictionally) a reason for Princess Wencheng's famed political marriage to Songtsen Gampo of the Tibetan Empire. Princess Wencheng was probably not an imperial princess but a niece or maid of Emperor Taizong's or the Imperial Household's, who was married to Songtsen Gampo, forging an alliance between the Tang Empire and the Tibetan Empire. Princess Wencheng would later help to develop technology and more civilised and idealistic standards of living in Tuoba, which was then regarded by the Chinese as an almost barbaric empire.
 The series mentions (and probably exaggerates) gender equality during the Tang Dynasty. The Tang Dynasty was in fact a period of a Chinese history in which women were fairly liberated, with records of outspoken courtesans and women of prominent families playing the Persian sport of polo with gentry men. The first instance of feminism in the Tang Dynasty was established very early on, when the daughter of the Tang's founding father Emperor Gaozu, Princess Pingyang, made large military contributions and in fact led military forces to help overthrow the Sui and establish the Tang.
 Emperor Taizong was the first husband of the young Wu Zetian, who would later become a favourite of Emperor Gaozong's, then his Empress consort, a regent power and eventually an Empress regnant in her own right, interrupting the Tang Dynasty's early stages with the Later Zhou. Wu Zetian would rule as the only historically recorded female imperial monarch of Chinese history, and she would even further contribute to gender equality in the Tang after Princess Pingyang. Her efforts would include the installing Shangguan Wan'er as a political and literary scholar.
 The series references trade with foreign empires. China at the time was by far the world's largest economy, and many foreign empires and states paid homage to China and traded with China. Trade with the West flourished for China under the Tang. China also imported aspects of foreign culture. Chang'an, the Tang capital, was a cosmopolitan area boasting a huge population. Christianity reached China for the first time around the time setting of the series. Buddhism was imported during the Northern and Southern Dynasties from India and its presence was solidified under the Tang. Chinese hanfu also made major alterations, adopting some of the court styles of the Persian Empire. Sports, philosophies and consumer goods were all imported, as well as exported.

Lead cast
 Note: Some of the characters' names are in Cantonese romanisation.

Main cast
 Note: Some of the characters' names are in Cantonese romanisation.

Recurring cast
 Note: Some of the characters' names are in Cantonese romanisation.

International broadcast

Accolades

42nd Ming Pao Anniversary Awards 2010

TVB Anniversary Awards (2010)

16th Asian Television Awards 2011

Viewership ratings

References

External links
TVB.com Can't Buy Me Love – Official Website 
K for TVB Can't Buy Me Love – English Synopsis
List of Can't Buy Me Love episodes

TVB dramas
Television series set in the Tang dynasty
2010 Hong Kong television series debuts
2010 Hong Kong television series endings
2010s Hong Kong television series
Television series set in the 7th century